Jiang Feng may refer to:

Jiang Feng (artist) (1910–1983), Chinese artist
Jiang Feng (translator) (born 1929), Chinese translator
Jiang Feng (footballer) (born 1970), Chinese footballer